INS Gomati (F21) was a  guided-missile frigate of Indian Navy.

Career
The ship was built by Mazagon Dock Ltd in Mumbai and has an indigenous content of 72%. After her mid-life upgrade in 2011, the ship has been fitted with new weapons and sensors, which include the Barak surface-to-air missile system, an Oto Melara 76 mm gun, HUMSA sonar and Advanced Ship Control System for UAVs. On March 28, 2019, an Indian Navy personnel onboard INS Gomati died during weapons firing drills at sea. Gomati was decommissioned on 28 May 2022 after 34 years of service. The ship will be formally transferred to the Government of Uttar Pradesh on 28 May 2022, following which it will be completely dismantled and transported to Lucknow where it will be installed as the "Gomati Shaurya Smarak," a museum of Gomati 's service career.

References

1984 ships
Godavari-class frigates
Frigates of the Indian Navy
Ships built in India